The Vis is a  river in south-central France, in the Occitanie administrative region. It is a right tributary of the Hérault. Its source is in the Cévennes, near the village of Alzon. It flows between the Causse du Larzac and the Causse de Blandas into the Hérault and Gard departments. The Vis flows into the Hérault near Ganges.

Origin of the name
The name "Vis" derives from the old Proto-Indo-European root "Vir" which means "river", and which can be found in the name of many rivers in France such as the Vire.

Towns along the river
The Vis flows through the following communes from source to mouth:

 Arrigas
 Alzon
 Campestre-et-Luc
 Blandas
 Vissec
 Saint-Maurice-Navacelles
 Rogues
 Gorniès
 Saint-Laurent-le-Minier
 Saint-Julien-de-la-Nef
 Cazilhac

Hydrology and water quality
The Vis takes its source on the Saint-Guiral mount.

See also
 Cirque de Navacelles

References

  Cirque de Navacelles and the gorges of the Vis
  Banque Hydro - Station Y2035010 - La Vis à Saint-Laurent-le-Minier (Synthèse)

Rivers of France
Rivers of Occitania (administrative region)
Rivers of Gard
Rivers of Hérault
1Vis